Deborah Nowalski Kader, better known by her stage name Debi Nova born 6 August 1980, is a Costa Rican singer-songwriter who resides in Los Angeles.

She was involved in six Grammy award nominated projects, including a dance song, "One Rhythm", which reached number one on the US Dance Club Songs chart, which was featured on the EA FIFA 2005 video game. She has collaborated with artists including Boney James, Mark Ronson, Q-Tip, Sérgio Mendes, the Black Eyed Peas, Sean Paul, Ricky Martin, Franco De Vita and many more. On 2020 she was nominated for Best Latin Pop or Urban Album at the 63rd Grammy Awards for her fourth album '3:33'.

Early life
Debi was born on 6 August 1980, in San José, Costa Rica and is of Polish Jewish descent. She started playing piano at age four, and played classical music for ten years. She became a singer-songwriter and a multi-instrumentalist at the age of 14. She moved to Los Angeles at 17 when she signed her first record deal. She is a graduate of Los Angeles College of Music.

Career
Nova started as a backing vocalist for Gandhi, with whom she had the chance to open for Deep Purple. She has also worked with Ricky Martin, with whom she recorded a Spanish version of the song "I Don't Care". Nova sang background vocals for Britney Spears in her song "Lace and Leather", from her album Circus.

In 2004 she scored the number one track on the US Dance Club Songs chart with "One Rhythm". A remix of the song was featured on the soundtrack for the EA Sports video game FIFA Football 2005.

She was featured in projects by Illa J (brother of J Dilla) and Sa-Ra as well as Urban Legend's Tropical Techniques.

On April 20, 2010, she made her US television debut on Dancing with the Stars.  Nova also participated in the Colgate MaxWhite Charging Up The Music campaign.

She released her first studio album Luna Nueva in 2010, which featured her single "Drummer Boy".

In 2011, MTV Latin America awarded her the prize MTV Chiuku for her work in the United Nations campaign "UNITE to end violence against women" organized by UN Women, and in April 2012 she was named ambassador of YUNGA (Youth and United Nations Global Alliance).

Nova was one-third of the group "LR1" (Latinos are One) for a while, along with Jean Shepherd (of the electro-Latin funk band, Navegante) and Velcro. Their single "Maña y Corazón" was produced by Andres Levin and released on September 13, 2011, to kick off Latino Heritage Month.

Nova was selected as the official voice of the Central American Games, San José 2013, with the song "Arriba Arriba" (Get Up, Get Up) and was also invited to participate in the TEDx Joven Pura Vida (Youth Pure Life) conference, where she shared her story, her music and encouraged young people to follow their dreams.

On December 17, 2013, she released her EP Un Dia a la Vez. The project was entirely in Spanish and served as a preview for her next album, "SOY", which was released on June 24, 2014. The album was produced by Grammy-winning producer Cachorro López. The album released four singles, "Un Día A La Vez", "Amor", "Emergencia" and "Cupido". The latter was released in two versions, one featuring Puerto Rican singer Sie7e, and the other featured Jamaican Reggae/Dancehall singer Ce'Cile.

SOY was nominated at the 2014 Latin Grammy Awards in the Best New Vocal Pop Album category.

in 2016, Debi won the first season of Colombia's Version of Dancing with the Stars.

She released her third album Gran Ciudad in 2017, on Sony Music Latin for which she was nominated at the Latin Grammys 2017 in the category "Best Singer-Songwriter Album". She performed her single "No Nos Sobran Los Domingos" at the 2017 pre-Grammy show.

In May 2020 she released her album '3:33' after a series of concerts in Costa Rica. She was nominated at the 2020 Latin Grammys for Best Tropical Song for her song "Quédate" in collaboration with Pedro Capó and for Best Singer-Songwriter album for "3:33". The album was also nominated for Best Engineered Album, which ended up winning. Nova performed the song "3:33" at the main ceremony. On November 24, 2020, it was announced that Nova was nominated for Best Latin Pop or Urban Album at the 63rd Grammy Awards Ceremony, her first nomination at the awards.

Discography

Studio albums
 Luna Nueva (2010)
 Soy (2014)
 Gran Ciudad (2017)
 3:33 (2020)

Singles

Participations
 2002 : Won't You Stay by Norman Brown
 2003 : Tomorrow by Mark Ronson
 2004 : Appreciate by Boney James
 2005 : Qué Más Da by Ricky Martin
 2006 : Timeless by Sergio Mendes
 2008 : Circus by Britney Spears
 2014 : Latin Lovers

Collaborations
 2003 : International Affair by Sean Paul
 2003 : Latin Girls by The Black Eyed Peas
 2005 : One Rhythm (Do Yard Riddim Mix), FIFA Football 2005
 2011 : Si Quieres Decir Adiós de Franco De Vita
 2012 : One Woman
 2018 : Paradise de Barzo
 2018 : Tú No Te Imaginas by Gian Marco
 2020 : QTPC de BAMBI

Important Performances 
 2020: Latin Grammy Awards
 2017: “Latin Grammy Pre-Show”
 2017: “Sofar Songs from a Room & Amnesty International”
 2016: “RiseUp AS ONE “
 2015: “Dalai Lama's 80th Birthday”
 2015: “South South Awards”
 2014: “Sofar Songs from a Room”
 2014: “Latin Grammy Person Of The Year”
 2013: “TEDx Pura Vida” 
 2009: “Dancing With The Stars”
 2010: “So You Think You Can Dance”
 2010: “Despierta America”
 2010: “LARAS”
2010: “World Youth Conference MX”
 2007: “Miss Costa Rica”
 2005: “Victoria's Secret Fashion Show (with Ricky Martin)”

Films featuring Debi Nova’s music
 2017: Hombre de Fe: Al Frente
 2016: First Lady of the Revolution: Guerrera
 2015: Pr1mero de Enero: Volver a Comenzar
 2015: Spare Parts: Guerrero (Fonseca ft. Debi Nova)
 2011: From Prada to Nada: Need 2 B Loved
 2006: Americano: Naturale
 2005: Prime: Lay Low
 2004: Mean Girls: Let Me Let Go

Filmography

Film

Television

Awards and nominations

See also
List of number-one dance hits (United States)
List of artists who reached number one on the US Dance chart

References

External links
 Official Website
 
 
1. *”5 questions for Costa Rican musician Debi Nova - The Tico Times - February, 2018” - 
“http://www.ticotimes.net/2018/02/17/5-questions-for-costa-rican-musician-debi-nova-2”

2. *”Feature – Debi Nova, Costa Rican Singing Sensation - Howler Magazine - May 2017”
 Feature - Debi Nova, Costa Rican Singing Sensation

3. *”Debi Nova, Costa Rican Singer-Songwriter - The Costa Rica Star - June 17, 2016” -
“https://news.co.cr/debi-nova/48029/”

4. *”Debi Nova Among Tico Nominations At Latin Grammys - Costa Rica Extra - September 2014” -
“http://qcostarica.com/debi-nova-among-tico-nominations-at-latin-grammys/”

5. *“UN DÍA A LA VEZ” DE DEBI NOVA DISPONIBLE YA EN iTUNES - People Music - December, 2013”
“http://www.peoplemusic.com/un-dia-a-la-vez-de-debi-nova-disponible-ya-en-itunes/”

6. *”Noche de luna purpura - La Nacion - April 2012” - “http://wvw.nacion.com/viva/1998/febrero/10/espec1.html”

7. *”Debi Nova, Biography by Andy Kellman - All Music - May, 2010” - “https://www.allmusic.com/artist/debi-nova-mn0000677245”

1980 births
Living people
People from San José, Costa Rica
Costa Rican Jews
Costa Rican people of Polish-Jewish descent
American people of Polish-Jewish descent
Costa Rican emigrants to the United States
Costa Rican women singers
Costa Rican dance musicians
21st-century women singers
Women in Latin music
Latin music songwriters